"Hold It Now, Hit It" is a song by American hip hop group Beastie Boys, released as the first 
single from their debut album Licensed to Ill. It is also remixed on the album New York State of Mind.

In 2008, it was ranked number 27 on VH1's 100 Greatest Songs of Hip Hop.

Music video
The video features the three rappers lip synching, ad-libbing, and dancing on a sidewalk in front of and directly to a fish-eye lens interspersed with clips of them on stage and on tour.

Samples and use in sampling
The song contains samples from "Bertha Butt Boogie" by The Jimmy Castor Bunch, "Drop the Bomb" and "Let's Get Small" by Trouble Funk, "Funky Stuff" by Kool & The Gang, "Take Me to the Mardi Gras" by Bob James, "Christmas Rappin'" by Kurtis Blow and "La Di Da Di" by Doug E. Fresh and MC Ricky D.

The line "Pump it up, homeboy" was sampled by Eric B. & Rakim on their song "As the Rhyme Goes On" and by Ice-T on his song "Ya Don't Quit". The line "Beer drinking, breath stinking, sniffing glue" was sampled by Dr. Dre on Eazy-E's "Boyz-n-the-Hood".

Track listing

7" single
"Hold It Now, Hit It" - 3:30
"Hold It Now, Hit It" (A  cappella) - 3:20

12" single
"Hold It Now, Hit It" - 3:30
"Hold It Now, Hit It" (Instrumental) - 3:30
"Hold It Now, Hit It" (A cappella) - 3:20

Charts

References

External links

1986 singles
Beastie Boys songs
Song recordings produced by Rick Rubin
Songs written by Rick Rubin
Songs written by Ad-Rock
Songs written by Mike D
Songs written by Adam Yauch
1986 songs